Prasarn Trairatvorakul (born 20 August 1952) is a Thai banker. He is former governor of Bank of Thailand.

Education
He graduated with first class honours, gold medal in bachelor's degree of electrical engineering from Chulalongkorn University. He also has a masters of engineering degree in industrial engineering and management from Asian Institute of Technology, Bangkok, Thailand, a master's degree in business administration, Harvard University, Massachusetts, U.S.A., and a doctor of business administration degree from Harvard.

Careers
He started working as an academic economist at Bank of Thailand in 1983 until 1989. He became secretary of The Securities and Exchange Commission, Thailand. He worked as president of Kasikorn Bank from 2004 to 2010. In 2010, He was appointed as governor of Bank of Thailand. On 5 February 2021, he was appointed to be Chairman of Stock Exchange of Thailand board of Governors.

References

 
 

Prasarn Trairatvorakul
Prasarn Trairatvorakul
Harvard Business School alumni
1952 births
Living people